Paul Sykes (1937–1994), was an American folksinger, best known for live performances in the early 1960s at The Ice House, a folk music club in Pasadena, California, and as a member of folk trio The Randy Sparks Three.  He also performed at The Troubadour (Los Angeles).

He was a prize-winning Whippet enthusiast in Coronado, California throughout the 1960s.

Discography

References
 Billboard (magazine)
 Mar 3, 1958, p. 17 (Great American Folk Songs in new LP releases)
 Apr 14, 1958, p. 26 (review of Great American Folk Songs)
 June 2, 1962, p. 22 (review of The Randy Sparks Three)
 Mar 2, 1963, p. 18 (article about live recordings at The Ice House)
 Jan 16, 1965, p. 28 (Candy Man in Warner Bros. Records ad)
 Feb 6, 1965, p. 42 (review of Candy Man)
 Feb 20, 1965, p. 39 (Candy Man in new LP releases)
 Palm Beach Post
 March 20, 1965, p. F12 (review of Candy Man)
 American Whippet Club - Whippet News
 June, 1962

External links
 Horizon discography
 Verve discography
 Crown discography
 Warner Brothers discography

American folk singers
1994 deaths
1937 births
20th-century American singers
20th-century American male singers